La Bonne Chanson is a Canadian publishing and independent record label.

La Bonne Chanson may also refer to:
 La Bonne Chanson (poetry collection), of 1869-1870 by French poet Paul Verlaine
 La Bonne Chanson (Fauré), a song cycle composed 1892–94 by Gabriel Fauré to texts by Paul Verlaine